Cheyne Damon Rahme (born 23 January 1991) is a South African track and field athlete who competes in the pole vault. He was the gold medallist at the 2014 African Championships in Athletics.

The son of former national decathlon champion, Damon Rahme, Cheyne Rahme competed in the pole vault from a young age, representing South Africa at the 2007 World Youth Championships in Athletics and the 2008 World Junior Championships in Athletics. He broke the national youth record in 2007, clearing . He improved this is  the following year. He made his first international podium at the 2008 Commonwealth Youth Games, taking silver behind Australia's Blake Lucas.

Rahme set an African junior record in April 2010, clearing  at the South African Junior Championships. He came close to his first senior medal later that season at the 2010 Commonwealth Games, where he was fourth behind Max Eaves.

After missing the 2013 season, he returned in good form the year after. He represented the continent at the 2014 IAAF Continental Cup, coming in sixth.

He did not compete in the 2015 season.

International competitions

National titles
South African Athletics Championships
Pole vault: 2011, 2014, 2015

References

External links

All-Athletics

Living people
1991 births
South African male pole vaulters
Commonwealth Games competitors for South Africa
Athletes (track and field) at the 2010 Commonwealth Games
South African Athletics Championships winners